A metallic soap is a metallic salt of a fatty acid. Theoretically, soaps can be made of any metal, although not all enjoy practical uses. Varying the metal can strongly affect the properties of the compound, particularly its solubility.

Alkali, alkaline earth soaps

Alkali metal and alkaline earth soaps are white solids. The most commonly encountered are traditional household soaps, which are the fatty acid salts of sodium (hard soap) and potassium (soft soap). Lithium soap or greases, such as lithium stearate, are insoluble in water and find use in lubricating grease. 

Calcium and magnesium soaps are most commonly encountered as soap scum but the pure materials have a variety of uses. Magnesium stearate and calcium stearate are used as excipients, lubricants, release agents, and food additives, with the later use being covered be the generic E numbers of E470b and E470 respectively.

Other metal soaps
Aluminium soaps are used as thickening agents, in the production of cosmetics. Other examples include mixed calcium/zinc soaps which are used as heat stabilizer for polyvinyl chloride.  Soaps of iron, cobalt and manganese are used as drying agents in paints and varnishes and work by promoting the oxidation and crosslinking of unsaturated oils.

References

Salts